Freddie Pendleton (born January 5, 1963) is an American former professional boxer who competed from 1981 to 2001.

Pendleton won his first title in October 1985 knocking out Darryl Martin (9-2) in the 6th round earning him the Pennsylvania State light welterweight title.

In March 1986, "Fearless", who was (14-13) at the time, took on Roger Mayweather (23-3) at the Sahara Hotel in Las Vegas, Nevada. He knocked out Roger in the 6th round for a TKO win.

Four months later, Pendleton took on Frankie Randall (27-1) for the second time.  Only this time was for the vacant USBA lightweight title.  The fight went the distance and was a draw. Freddie later won the USBA lightweight title and defended it successfully in 1987 and 1988.

In 1990, Pendleton fought a world title against unified WBC & IBF lightweight champion, Pernell Whitaker (20-1). Although prior to the contest, few had placed much faith in Freddie's abilities to provide a competitive effort in the fight, due to his 24-16 record, Freddie did just that. The fight turned out to be a, "barn burner," far better than anyone had expected; It was a genuinely classy effort by Pendleton against one of best fighters in the world. While correctly deemed a unanimous decision win for Whitaker, most observers generally thought the fight was much, much closer than the scorecards reflected(Judges Jim Traylor and Stuart Winston scored it 116-112, with Phil Newman 117-113 all for Pernell Whitaker). 

In 1993, he captured the Vacant IBF lightweight title with a decision win over Tracy Spann.  He defended the belt once before losing it to Rafael Ruelas in 1994.  Although he continued to fight until 2001, Pendleton never regained a major belt, losing to IBF welterweight title holder Félix Trinidad in 1996, IBF light welterweight title holder Vince Phillips in 1997, and WBA welterweight title holder James Page in 1999.

He retired in 2001 after being KO'd by Ricky Hatton.

On June 26, 2011, Freddie Pendleton was inducted into the Florida Boxing Hall of Fame.

Professional boxing record

See also 
 List of IBF world champions

External links 
 

1963 births
International Boxing Federation champions
Lightweight boxers
Living people
Boxers from Philadelphia
American male boxers